Stand by Me is a 1986 American independent coming-of-age drama film directed by Rob Reiner. It is based on Stephen King's 1982 novella The Body, with the title deriving from the song of the same name by Ben E. King. The film is set in Castle Rock, Oregon in 1959 and stars Wil Wheaton, River Phoenix, Corey Feldman, and Jerry O'Connell as four boys who go on a hike to find the dead body of a missing boy.

Stand by Me received overwhelmingly positive reviews and was nominated for an Academy Award for Best Adapted Screenplay and for two Golden Globe Awards: one for Best Drama Motion Picture and one for Best Director. It is considered by many to be one of the most influential films of the 1980s, as well as one of the greatest films of all time.

Plot

Writer Gordon “Gordie” Lachance reads a newspaper article about a fatal stabbing. He recalls an incident from when he was 12 years old when he, his best friend, Chris Chambers, and two other friends, Teddy Duchamp and Vern Tessio, went searching for the body of a missing boy named Ray Brower near the fictional town of Castle Rock, Oregon, during Labor Day weekend in 1959. As a child, Gordie's parents largely ignored him due to grief over the death of his big brother, Denny.

Vern overhears his older brother, Billy, talking with his friend, Charlie, about finding the body. Billy does not want to inform the police because it could draw attention to a car theft he and Charlie committed.

When Vern tells his friends about the body, the four boys — hoping to become local heroes — decide to go look for it. After Chris steals his father's pistol, he and Gordie run into local hoodlums "Ace" Merrill and Chris's older brother, "Eyeball." Ace threatens Chris with a lit cigarette and steals Gordie's Yankees cap, which was a gift from Denny.

The boys begin their trip. After stopping at a junkyard for water, they are caught trespassing by owner Milo Pressman and his dog, Chopper. Once they escape over a fence, Milo calls Teddy's mentally ill veteran father a "loony" and refers to how he almost burned Teddy's ear off. An enraged Teddy tries to attack Milo but the other boys restrain him.

The four continue their hike, and Chris encourages Gordie to fulfill his potential as a writer despite his father's disapproval. When they cross a railroad bridge, Gordie and Vern are nearly killed by an approaching train but jump off the tracks and escape serious injury.

In the evening, as the boys camp, Gordie tells a fictional story he created about "David 'Lard-Ass' Hogan", an obese boy who is constantly bullied. Seeking payback, he enters a pie-eating contest and throws up deliberately, inducing mass vomiting among everyone there.

That night, Chris complains to Gordie that he hates being associated with his family's reputation. He admits stealing school milk money but says he confessed to a teacher yet was still suspended as the teacher kept quiet and pocketed the money. Devastated by the teacher's betrayal, Chris breaks down and cries.

The next day, the boys swim across a swamp, discovering it's filled with leeches. Gordie faints after finding one in his underwear. After more hiking, the boys locate the body. The discovery traumatizes Gordie, who asks Chris why Denny had to die and cries about his father hating him. Chris comforts Gordie and asserts that his father simply doesn't know him.

Ace and his gang arrive to claim the body and threaten to hurt the boys if they stay. When Chris insults Ace and doesn't back down, Ace draws a switchblade. Gordie gets the gun, fires a warning shot, and stands beside Chris while pointing the gun at Ace. Ace demands the weapon, but Gordie refuses while insulting and threatening him. Ace and his gang vow revenge and leave. The boys realize it's wrong to exploit Ray Brower's death and instead report it via an anonymous phone call. They walk back to Castle Rock and part ways.

Back in present day, Gordie is finishing a memoir of the experience. He notes that Vern and Teddy separated from him and Chris in junior high. Vern married after high school, had four children, and became a forklift operator. Teddy tried to get into the Army but failed due to his ear and his eyesight and wound up serving time in jail. Chris took college prep courses with Gordie and, despite struggling, later became a lawyer, with the two eventually drifting apart. While recently attempting to break up a fight in a restaurant, Chris was stabbed to death. Gordie writes that although he hadn't seen Chris in over a decade, he'll miss him forever. He ends his story with "I never had any friends later on like the ones I had when I was twelve. Jesus, does anyone?" before going outside to play with his son.

Cast

Production

Development
The film was adapted from the Stephen King novella The Body. Bruce A. Evans sent a copy of The Body to Karen Gideon, the wife of his friend and writing partner Raynold Gideon, on August 29, 1983, as a gift for her birthday. Both Gideon and Evans quickly became fans of the novella and shortly thereafter contacted King's agent, Kirby McCauley, seeking to negotiate film rights; McCauley replied that King's terms were $100,000 and 10% of the gross profits. Although the money was not an issue, the share of gross profits was considered excessive, especially considering that no stars could be featured to help sell the movie. In response, Evans and Gideon pursued an established director, Adrian Lyne, to help sell the project.

After reading the novella, Lyne teamed up with Evans and Gideon, but all the studios the trio approached turned the project down except for Martin Shafer at Embassy Pictures. Embassy spent four months negotiating the rights with McCauley, settling on $50,000 and a smaller share of the profits, and Evans and Gideon spent eight weeks writing the screenplay. Evans and Gideon asked to also produce the film, but Shafer suggested they team up with Andy Scheinman, a more experienced producer. Embassy was unwilling to meet Lyne's salary for directing the film until Evans and Gideon agreed to give up half of their share of profits to meet Lyne's asking price.

Lyne was going to direct the film, but had promised himself a vacation following the production of 9½ Weeks, and would not be available to start production until the spring of 1986. Reiner was better known at the time for playing Michael Stivic in All in the Family and had just started a directing career, making comedies like This Is Spinal Tap and The Sure Thing. He was sent the script by Scheinman, and his initial reaction was the script had promise but "no focus". After Lyne withdrew from the project, Reiner signed on to direct in September 1984. In a 2011 interview, Reiner discussed his realization that the film should focus on the character of Gordie:

"In the book, it was about four boys, but...once I made Gordie the central focus of the piece then it made sense to me: this movie was all about a kid who didn't feel good about himself and whose father didn't love him. And through the experience of going to find the dead body and his friendship with these boys, he began to feel empowered and went on to become a very successful writer. He basically became Stephen King."

Reiner has said that he identified with Gordie, as he himself struggled with the shadow of fame cast by his comedian father, Carl Reiner. The writers incorporated Reiner's suggestions, producing a new script by December 1984 for Embassy's review and approval.

Days before the shooting started in the summer of 1985, Embassy was sold to Columbia Pictures, which made plans to cancel the production. Norman Lear, one of the co-owners of Embassy and the developer of All in the Family, gave  of his own money to complete the film, citing his faith in Reiner and the script. However, since Embassy also would have distributed the film, once the film was completed it had no distributor. The producers showed a print to Michael Ovitz, head of the powerful Creative Artists Agency, and Ovitz promised to help them find a distributor. Paramount, Universal Pictures, and Warner Bros. all passed on the film; Columbia Pictures production head Guy McElwaine screened the film at his house because he was feeling ill, and the positive reaction of his daughters convinced him to distribute the film. In March 1986, Columbia Pictures, concerned that the original title, The Body, was misleading, renamed the film Stand by Me. According to screenwriter Raynold Gideon, The Body "sounded like either a sex film, a bodybuilding film, or another Stephen King horror film. Rob came up with Stand by Me, and it ended up being the least unpopular option."

Casting
In a 2011 interview with NPR, Wil Wheaton attributed the film's success to the director's casting choices:

Feldman recalled how his home life translated into his onscreen character: "[Most kids aren't] thinking they're going to get hit by their parents because they're not doing well enough in school, which will prevent them from getting a work permit, which will prevent them from being an actor." O'Connell agreed that he was cast based on how his personality fit the role, saying "Rob wanted us to understand our characters. He interviewed our characters. [...] I tried to stay like Vern and say the stupid things Vern would. I think I was Vern that summer." Reiner and the producers interviewed more than 70 boys for the four main roles, out of more than 300 who auditioned; Phoenix originally read for the part of Gordie Lachance. Ethan Hawke auditioned for Chris Chambers.

Before filming began, Reiner put the four main actors together for two weeks to play games from Viola Spolin's Improvisation for the Theater (which Reiner called "the bible" of theater games) and build camaraderie. As a result, a friendship developed between the actors. Wheaton would recall "When you saw the four of us being comrades, that was real life, not acting."

Before settling on Richard Dreyfuss as the narrator (and the role of the adult Gordie), Reiner considered David Dukes, Ted Bessell, and Michael McKean.

Filming

Principal photography began on June 17, 1985, and ended on August 23, 1985.

Parts of the film were shot in Brownsville, Oregon, which stood in for the fictional town of Castle Rock. The town was selected for its small-town 1950s ambience. Approximately 100 local residents were employed as extras.

The "barf-o-rama" scene was also filmed in Brownsville. A local bakery supplied the pies and extra filling, which was mixed with large-curd cottage cheese to simulate the vomit.

The scene where the boys outrace a steam train engine across an 80-foot tall trestle was filmed on the McCloud River Railroad, above Lake Britton Reservoir near McArthur-Burney Falls Memorial State Park in California. The scene took a full week to shoot, making use of four small adult female stunt doubles with closely cropped hair who were made up to look like the film's protagonists. Plywood planks were laid across the ties to provide a safer surface on which the stunt doubles could run. The film crew even brought a brand-new camera for use in the shot, only for it to jam between the rails on the first shot. The locomotive used for the scene, M.C.R.R. 25, is still in daily operation for excursion service on the Oregon Coast Scenic Railroad. Telephoto compression was used to make the train appear much closer than it actually was. The actors did not feel a sense of danger until Reiner threatened them as follows: "You see those guys? They don't want to push that dolly down the track anymore. And the reason they're getting tired is because of you... I told them if they weren't worried that the train was going to kill them, then they should worry that I was going to. And that's when they ran."

Music
Jack Nitzsche composed the film's musical score. On August 8, 1986, a soundtrack album was released containing many of the 1950s and early 1960s oldies songs featured in the film:
 "Everyday" (Buddy Holly) – 2:07
 "Let the Good Times Roll" (Shirley and Lee) – 2:22
 "Come Go with Me" (The Del-Vikings) – 2:40
 "Whispering Bells" (The Del-Vikings) – 2:25
 "Get a Job" (The Silhouettes) – 2:44
 "Lollipop" (The Chordettes) – 2:09
 "Yakety Yak" (The Coasters) – 1:52
 "Great Balls of Fire" (Jerry Lee Lewis) – 1:52
 "Mr. Lee" (The Bobbettes) – 2:14
 "Stand by Me" (Ben E. King) – 2:55

The movie's success sparked a renewed interest in Ben E. King's song "Stand by Me". Initially a number four pop hit in 1961, the song re-entered the Billboard Hot 100 in October 1986, eventually peaking at number nine in December of that year. The song was also reissued in the United Kingdom and Republic of Ireland, where it topped the UK Singles Chart and Irish Singles Chart respectively for three consecutive weeks in February 1987. The movie was released in both countries the following month.

Charts

Certifications

Home media
Stand by Me was released on VHS on March 19, 1987, by RCA/Columbia Pictures Home Video. A DVD was issued on August 29, 2000, with a director's commentary, multiple language options (subtitles and audio), scene selections with motion images, and a featurette called "Walking The Tracks- The Summer Of Stand by Me." The film was re-issued on Blu-ray in 2011 by Sony Pictures Home Entertainment, and again on 4K Blu-ray in 2019.

Reception

Box office
The film was a box office success in North America. It opened in a limited release in 16 theaters on August 8, 1986, and grossed $242,795, averaging $15,174 per theater. The film then had its wide opening in 745 theaters on August 22 and grossed $3,812,093, averaging $5,116 per theater and ranking number 2. The film's widest release was 848 theaters, and it ended up earning $52,287,414 overall, well above its $8 million budget.

Critical response
Reviewing the film for The New York Times, Walter Goodman opined that Reiner's direction was rather self-conscious, "looking constantly at his audience". Goodman called the film a "trite narrative" and said that "Reiner's direction hammers in every obvious element in an obvious script." In his review for the Chicago Tribune, Dave Kehr wrote that there was "nothing natural in the way Reiner has overloaded his film with manufactured drama". In contrast, Sheila Benson called the film "[a treasure] absolutely not to be missed" in her review for the Los Angeles Times. Paul Attanasio, reviewing for The Washington Post, called the acting ensemble "wonderful" and particularly praised the performances by Wheaton and Phoenix.

Stephen King was very impressed with the film. On the special features of the 25th anniversary Blu-ray set, King indicated that he considered the film to be the first successful translation to film of any of his works. According to a later interview with Gene Siskel, Reiner recalled that after a private early screening of the film, King excused himself for fifteen minutes to compose himself; he later returned to remark, "'That's the best film ever made out of anything I've written, which isn't saying much. But you've really captured my story. It is autobiographical.'"

In a Reddit "Ask Me Anything" chat in 2017, Reiner said that Stand by Me is his personal favorite of his own films.

On Rotten Tomatoes, the film has an approval rating of 92% based on 59 reviews and a rating average of 8/10. The website's critical consensus reads: "Stand by Me is a wise, nostalgic movie with a weird streak that captures both Stephen King's voice and the trials of growing up." On Metacritic, the film has a weighted average score of 75 out of 100 based on 20 critics, indicating "generally favorable reviews." Audiences polled by CinemaScore gave the film an average grade of "A" on an A+ to F scale.

Awards

At the 8th Youth in Film Awards, the film received the Jackie Coogan Award for Outstanding Contribution to Youth Through Motion Picture – Ensemble Cast in a Feature Film (Wil Wheaton, River Phoenix, Corey Feldman, and Jerry O'Connell).

 Nominations 
 Academy Award for Best Screenplay Based on Material from Another Medium (Raynold Gideon and Bruce A. Evans)
 Directors Guild of America Award for Outstanding Directing – Feature Film (Rob Reiner)
 Golden Globe Award for Best Motion Picture – Drama
 Golden Globe Award for Best Director (Rob Reiner)
 Independent Spirit Award for Best Film (Andrew Scheinman, Raynold Gideon, and Bruce A. Evans)
 Independent Spirit Award for Best Director (Rob Reiner)
 Independent Spirit Award for Best Screenplay (Raynold Gideon and Bruce A. Evans)
 National Board of Review Awards 1986 Top Ten Films (awarded)
 Writers Guild of America Award for Best Adapted Screenplay (Raynold Gideon and Bruce A. Evans)

Legacy
In a 2011 piece entitled "25 years of 'Stand by Me'", writer Alex Hannaford opined that "[for] anyone older than about 33, Stand by Me remains one of the greatest films to come out of the Eighties." Hannaford added that the film "has a charm and depth that seems to resonate with each generation".

In 2016, several writers commemorated the 30-year anniversary of the film's release. Rolling Stone'''s Charles Bramesco called Stand By Me "timeless", "a staple of youthful nostalgia for its deft straddling of the line between childhood and adulthood", and "the rare movie that necessarily gets better with time". Others described the film as a "coming-of-age classic" and as a film that stood at "the apex of the ’80s kids’ movie boom".

Events and tourism
Brownsville, Oregon has held an annual "Stand By Me Day" since 2007. The event has attracted international participants. On July 24, 2010, a 25th Anniversary celebration of the filming of Stand by Me was held in Brownsville. The event included a cast and crew Q&A session, an amateur pie-eating contest, and an outdoor showing of the film.

In 2013, July 23 was designated as Stand By Me Day by the Brownsville Chamber of Commerce. To encourage tourism, the city has embedded a penny in the street at a location where the fictional Vern found one in the film. An advertising mural painted for the movie production has survived.

Film

The Oscar-nominated urban drama Boyz n the Hood has several direct references to Stand by Me, including a trip by four young children to see a dead body, and the closing fade-out of one of the main characters.  Director John Singleton has stated that he included the references because he was a fan of the movie.

The coming-of-age film Now and Then (1995) has been described as a "female" version of Stand by Me by many critics.

Jonathan Bernstein states the pop culture discussions between characters in films by Quentin Tarantino originate in the similar semi-serious banter between the boys of Stand by Me.

Reviewers have seen an influence from Stand by Me in the 2011 movie Attack the Block, directed by Joe Cornish.

The movie Mud (2012) has a character (Neckbone) who has been called a "perfect fusion of River Phoenix and Jerry O'Connell in 'Stand by Me.'" The writer and director, Jeff Nichols, said of the film "Yeah, you know, I basically remade Stand by Me" when defending the work-in-progress to studio executives.The Kings of Summer, a 2013 coming-of-age film by Jordan Vogt-Roberts, has been reviewed as being inspired by Stand by Me.Love and Monsters (2020) includes an excerpt of the song "Stand by Me" and shortly after a scene involving large poisonous leeches.

Music
Dan Mangan's song "Rows of Houses" (2011) is based on the film and takes the perspective of Gordie Lachance.

The movie is mentioned in Yung Gravy's 2022 single C'est La Vie (with bbno$ and Rich Brian).

Production company
In 1987, following the success of Stand by Me, Reiner co-founded a film and television production company and named it Castle Rock Entertainment, after the fictional town in which the film is set.

Television
 Seinfeld, the first television show produced by Reiner's Castle Rock production company, featured banter between Jerry Seinfeld and George Costanza that was reminiscent of the dialogue between the protagonists of Stand by Me.
 The plotline of "The Blunder Years", a 2001 episode from the thirteenth season of The Simpsons, revolves around a repressed childhood trauma in which Homer Simpson, along with his friends Lenny and Carl, discover a body blocking an inlet for the Springfield Quarry.
 The film was parodied as one of three King stories in the Family Guy seventh season episode "Three Kings". In addition to featuring Dreyfuss reprising his role as the Narrator, the episode makes several references to the film and its cast.
 Actors auditioning for roles on the Netflix show Stranger Things were asked to read lines from Stand by Me and the fourth episode was titled "The Body" in homage to the source novella.
 The Rick and Morty episode "The Ricklantis Mixup" makes references to the film with four multi-verse Mortys, and another reference during a campfire.
 The film is featured in the Euphoria episode "A Thousand Little Trees of Blood" when Fez and Lexi watch the movie and sing the title song with each other.
 The Mark Kermode's Secrets of Cinema episode "Coming of Age" contrasts Stand by Me, which features the discovery of the body at the end of the film, with Boyz n the Hood, which opens with it; whereas in Stand by Me, the death comes as a shock, in Boyz n the Hood it is an everyday occurrence.
 The opening of Lycoris Recoil has its main protagonists playfully kick each other in a similar manner to one scene in the film. 
 The 6th season of Cold Case'' episode One Small Step is reminsent of Stand By Me including 4 boys on an adventure.

Video games
The film is referenced in Pokémon Red, Green, Blue, and Yellow for the Nintendo Game Boy, as well their Game Boy Advance remakes, Pokémon FireRed and LeafGreen, where the player character's mother is watching the movie on TV. When interacting with the TV, the player character says: "There's a movie on TV. Four boys are walking on railroad tracks. I better go too." This reference exists in both the original Japanese versions and the English localizations, though the reference changes to The Wizard of Oz in the remakes when the female player character is selected.

References

External links

 
 
 
 Brownsville, Oregon Stand by Me film locations from Brownsville Chamber of Commerce

Reviews
 
 

1986 films
Films about teenagers
1980s adventure films
1980s buddy drama films
1980s coming-of-age drama films
1980s teen drama films
1986 drama films
American buddy drama films
American comedy-drama films
American coming-of-age films
American independent films
Columbia Pictures films
Films about friendship
Films based on short fiction
Films based on works by Stephen King
Films directed by Rob Reiner
Films scored by Jack Nitzsche
Films set in 1959
Films set in the 1950s
Films set in Oregon
Films shot in California
Films shot in Oregon
1980s English-language films
1980s American films
Films about children
Rail transport films
1986 independent films